Viola von Cramon-Taubadel, often officially referred as simply Viola von Cramon ( Gehring, born Halle (Westphalia), 23 March 1970) is a German  politician of Alliance 90/The Greens who has been a member of the European Parliament since 2019. She previously represented Lower Saxony in the Bundestag, the German federal parliament, from 2009 to 2013.

Early life
Viola was born in Werther, North Rhine-Westphalia as the elder daughter of restaurant owner Hartwig Gehring and his wife Margit.

Education and early career
Viola von Cramon graduated from Ratsgymnasium Bielefeld in 1989. From 1990 to 1991 she did an internship in field of Agriculture at Demeter Charity Organization in Upper Bavaria. From 1992 to 1993, she was an Erasmus Scholar at Wye College in Kent Country followed by the Language and Study visit to Russia in 1993, traineeship in Voronezh and Belgorod within the World Bank Feasibility study project in 1994 and study visit to Estonia in 1995.

In 1996, von Cramon was employed as an assistant to the Ukrainian Government within the economic-political project of German Government in Kyiv. She continued studies and graduated from University of Bonn in 1997 with a degree in Agricultural economics. From 1993 to 1996, parallel to her studies and professional activities, she lectured at Agra-Europe and other publishing houses.

From 1997 to 2004 von Cramon was operating independent projects in Central and Eastern Europe. In 2006-2007 she attended lectures at Cornell University in Ithaca, New York.

Political career
Von Cramon has been a member of the Green Party since 2001.

Member of the German Parliament, 2009–2013
Von Cramon was a member of the German Bundestag from 2009 until 2013. Within her parliamentary group, she served as spokeswoman for the foreign relations of the European Union and sports. Besides that, she was also responsible for relations to China, Central Asia and the Eastern Partnership countries.

In addition to her committee assignments, von Cramon served as Deputy Chairwoman of the German-Ukrainian Parliamentary Friendship Group and of the Parliamentary Friendship Group for Relations with the States of the Southern Caucasus (Armenia, Azerbaijan, Georgia). She was also a member of the Parliamentary Friendship Group for Relations with the States of Central Asia (Kazakhstan, Kyrgyzstan, Uzbekistan, Tadjikistan, Turkmenistan). From 2010 until 2014, she was a substitute member of the German delegation to the Parliamentary Assembly of the Council of Europe.

Member of the European Parliament, 2019–present
In August 2018, von Cramon announced that she would run for a parliamentary seat in the 2019 European elections. Since becoming a Member of the European Parliament, she has been serving on the Committee on Foreign Affairs. In this capacity, she is the Parliament’s rapporteur on relations to the Western Balkans. She also joined the Special Committee on Foreign Interference in all Democratic Processes in the European Union in 2020

In addition to her committee assignments, von Cramon has been part of the Parliament's delegations to the EU-Ukraine Parliamentary Association Committee (since 2017), to the Euronest Parliamentary Assembly (since 2017) and to Serbia (since 2020). She is also a member of the Democracy Support and Election Coordination Group (DEG), which oversees the Parliament’s election observation missions. In response to an invitation by President Hashim Thaçi, Federica Mogherini appointed her to lead an EU mission to observe the 2019 elections in Kosovo. In 2020, she joined the Inter-Parliamentary Alliance on China.

Since 2021, von Cramon has been part of the Parliament's delegation to the Conference on the Future of Europe.

Personal life
Von Cramon is married to German nobleman Stephan von Cramon-Taubadel, who currently works as a Professor of Agricultural policy at the University of Göttingen. They are parents of 4 children.

Other activities
 Heinrich Böll Foundation, Member of the Europe/Transatlantic Advisory Board (since 2009)
 Freya von Moltke Foundation for the New Kreisau, Member of the Advisory Board
 Foodwatch, Member
 German Agricultural Society (DLG), Member (1999-2008)

External links 

 MEP Viola von Cramon-Taubadel official website
 European Parliament profile
 Greens/EFA profile

References

1970 births
Living people
People from Halle (Westfalen)
Members of the Bundestag for Lower Saxony
MEPs for Germany 2019–2024
Members of the Bundestag 2009–2013
21st-century women MEPs for Germany
Members of the Bundestag for Alliance 90/The Greens

Alumni of Wye College